Jay Brannan (born March 29, 1982) is an American singer-songwriter and actor. He was born in Texas and briefly studied in Ohio, but moved to California to become an actor. Brannan appeared in the 2006 movie Shortbus, which included one of his songs in its soundtrack, and began to build a fan base by performing on YouTube. He released an EP and acted in Holding Trevor in 2007. Since then, he has toured and released four albums.

Early life and career
Brannan was born 1982 in Texas in a middle-class family and grew up as the son of a petroleum engineer and a teacher. He described his family as conservative Baptists and mentions their beliefs on homosexuality. Brannan went to college for one semester in Cincinnati, Ohio, and went to California, first to Palm Springs and later to Los Angeles, trying to become an actor. In 2002, he was shown a casting notice and, after the end of a relationship, moved to New York City and submitted an audition tape. He also worked as a proofreader of legal documents for a translation company.

Brannan was cast in 2003 for the movie Shortbus and worked as a proofreader and in other jobs to support himself. He contributed the song "Soda Shop" to the film's soundtrack, which he stated was his "first professionally recorded track". The song was also released on Team Love Records. Brannan began to record sparse music videos for YouTube, accompanying himself on the guitar, and built an international fan base without corporate sponsorship, using MySpace and Blogspot. In 2007, he appeared in the movie Holding Trevor as the promiscuous best friend of the protagonist, and released a limited-edition EP with fours songs named disasterpiece or Unmastered, adding two additional songs for a 2008 re-release.

In July 2008, Brannan released the album Goddamned through his own label, Great Depression Records, and toured ten dates, a departure from his previous practice of short tours of about four concerts. The same year, Brannan left his proofreading job and sustained himself with earnings from concerts and merchandise. His second album, In Living Cover, was released in 2009 and reached number ten on the Billboard Top Heatseekers chart for the week of July 25, 2009. Brannan promoted the album in an interview on ABC News's Now in July 2009. Always, Then, & Now, his fourth studio album, was released on July 15, 2014, on his own independent label Great Depression Records.

Style

Brannan is a tenor. Allmusic described his style as contemporary singer-songwriter and compared him to female artists, including Ani DiFranco, Lisa Loeb, Sinéad O'Connor, and Liz Phair. Goddamned was described as lo-fi and Brannan compared his concerts to intimate performances in his home. He has performed with Terra Naomi and both were compared in style and described as performing indie folk. The New York Times stated in 2006 that Brannan was sometimes compared to singer-songwriter Rufus Wainwright and that Brannan saw himself as echoing the angry and sad sound of female singers like Tracy Chapman and Joni Mitchell.

Awards and nominations
In 2006, he was nominated at the Gotham Awards for Best Ensemble Cast for role in 2006 film Shortbus (joint nomination with Sook-Yin Lee, Paul Dawson, Lindsay Beamish, PJ DeBoy, Raphael Barker, Peter Stickles and Justin Vivian Bond).
In 2012, he was nominated for a Genie Award in the category "Best Achievement in Music – Original Song" for his song "My Love, My Love" from the soundtrack of 2011 film Cloudburst.

Discography

Studio albums
2008: Goddamned
2009: In Living Cover 
2012: Rob Me Blind
2014: Always, Then, & Now

Extended plays
2007: Unmastered (re-released in 2008 with additional songs)
2013: Around the World in 80 Jays
2016: New York, New York

Singles

Songs
"Soda Shop" (track on the 2006 Shortbus soundtrack)
"Lower My Gun" (track on the 2008 Holding Trevor soundtrack)
"My Love, My Love" and "Takeoff" (two tracks on the 2011 Cloudburst soundtrack)

Videography
"Body's a Temple"
"Housewife"
"Can't Have It All"
"Greatest Hits"
"Beautifully"
"Rob Me Blind"
"Blue-Haired Lady"
"Square One"

Filmography

Film

References

External links

1982 births
Living people
Male actors from Texas
American male singer-songwriters
American folk-pop singers
American male film actors
American tenors
Singers from New York City
LGBT people from Texas
American LGBT singers
21st-century American male singers
21st-century American singers
Singer-songwriters from New York (state)